The following highways are numbered 356:

Canada
Prince Edward Island Route 356

Japan
 Japan National Route 356

United States
  Arkansas Highway 356
 County Road 356 (Leon County, Florida)
  Georgia State Route 356
  Indiana State Road 356
  Kentucky Route 356
  Maryland Route 356 (former)
  New York State Route 356 (former)
  Ohio State Route 356
  Pennsylvania Route 356
  Puerto Rico Highway 356
  Tennessee State Route 356
  Texas State Highway 356
  Virginia State Route 356